Over the Wall is a 1938 American drama film directed by Frank McDonald and written by Crane Wilbur and George Bricker, based on a story by Lewis E. Lawes. The film stars Dick Foran, June Travis, John Litel, Dick Purcell, Veda Ann Borg and George E. Stone. The film was released by Warner Bros. on April 2, 1938.

Plot
Jerry Davis is an outlaw and troublemaker, one day he gets arrested for murder and sent to Sing Sing, there he discovers that he has a great singing voice and begins to rehabilitate himself.

Cast 
Dick Foran as Jerry Davis
June Travis as Kay Norton
John Litel as Father Neil Connor
Dick Purcell as Ace Scanlon
Veda Ann Borg as Maxine
George E. Stone as Gyp
Ward Bond as Eddie Edwards
John Hamilton as Warden
Jonathan Hale as Governor
Tommy Bupp as Jimmy Davis
Robert Homans as John Davis 
Mabel Hart as Mrs. Davis
Raymond Hatton as Convict
Alan Davis as Joe 
Eddy Chandler as Prison Keeper

Production
Lawes wrote the story based on the life of Sing Sing inmate Alabama Pitts, who became a professional athlete following his stint as a well-known athlete in the prison. It was picked up by Warner Brothers by August 1935 under the title The Comeback. In November 1935, James Cagney was hired to portray Pitts' character in the film with Lloyd Bacon directing. However, due to Cagney's lawsuit against Warner Brothers for breach of contract, the studio replaced him. In April 1936, Dick Purcell was being considered for the role. Harry Sauber, Ben Markson, Tom Reed, and Jonathan Finn were initially working as screenplay writers as of June 1936. In July 1936, Ross Alexander was hired to replace Cagney as Pitts' character, but the role eventually went to Dick Foran. The film was titled Evidence during production, but was changed to Over the Wall in December 1937 before the film's release.

References

External links 
 

1938 films
Warner Bros. films
American drama films
1938 drama films
Films directed by Frank McDonald
American black-and-white films
1930s English-language films
1930s American films